This list of fonts contains every font shipped with Mac OS X 10.0 through macOS 10.14, including any that shipped with language-specific updates from Apple (primarily Korean and Chinese fonts). For fonts shipped only with Mac OS X 10.5, 
please see Apple's documentation.

System fonts up to Mac OS X 10.7

New fonts added with OS X 10.10 Yosemite
The following system fonts have been added with Yosemite:

 ITC Bodoni 72: Book, Italic, Bold (these three in separate fonts with lining and text figures), Small Caps, Ornaments (Sumner Stone)
 ITF Devanagari
 Kohinoor Devanagari (Satya Rajpurohit)
 Luminari (Philip Bouwsma)
 Phosphate: Inline and Solid (Steve Jackaman & Ashley Muir)
 Shree Devanagari 714 (Modular Infotech)
 SignPainter (House Industries)
 Skia: Light, Light Condensed, Light Extended, Condensed, Extended, Bold, Black, Black Condensed, Black Extended (Matthew Carter; system previously only included regular)
 Sukhumvit Set: Thin, Light, Text, Medium, SemiBold, Bold (Anuthin Wongsunkakon; previously used as a system font for iOS 7.0)
 Bitstream Symbols
 Trattatello (James Grieshaber)

New fonts added with OS X 10.11 El Capitan
At least the following system fonts have been added with El Capitan:

 PingFang SC / PingFang TC / PingFang HK, a new set of Chinese UI Fonts produced by DynaComware in lieu of deprecated STHeiti Family.
 San Francisco UI / Display / Text.

New fonts added with macOS 10.12 Sierra
At least the following system fonts have been added with Sierra:

 Toppan Bunkyu Mincho Pr6N Regular
 Toppan Bunkyu Midashi Mincho StdN ExtraBold
 Toppan Bunkyu Gothic Pr6N Regular / Demibold
 Toppan Bunkyu Midashi Gothic StdN Extrabold
 Monotype LingWai Medium (SC / TC)
 Songti (SC / TC)
 Yu Kyokasho N (Medium / Bold) (Vertical Version / Horizontal Version)
 San Francisco Mono

New fonts added with macOS 10.13 High Sierra
High Sierra added several system fonts or additional weights of existing system fonts:
 Charter (Roman, Italic, Bold, Bold Italic, Black, Black Italic)
 DIN (Alternate Bold, Condensed Bold)
 Hiragino Kaku Gothic StdN W8
 InaiMathi (Bold)
 Kai (Regular)
 Kaiti SC (Regular, Bold, Black)
 Myriad Arabic (Semibold)
 Noto Nastaliq Urdu
 Rockwell (Regular, Italic, Bold, Bold Italic)
 STIX Two Math
 STIX Two Text (Regular, Italic, Bold, Bold Italic)
 Sukothai (Regular, Bold)

macOS 10.14 Mojave

No new fonts were provided with Mojave.

Font appearances 

 These images compare Roman fonts only, in most styles:

 The fonts in the following list were included as "extras" with AppleWorks 6, which was bundled with new iMacs until 2006.

Hidden fonts
A number of fonts have also been provided with iMovie, iLife, iDVD and other Apple applications in hidden folders, for the sole use of these applications. The reason why these fonts are hidden is unknown, with licensing issues suggested as the cause. However, one may easily install them for use by all applications by copying them out of their Library directories and installing them as with any third-party font, although one should always check that the license for the fonts allows them to be used outside the given software.

Notable hidden fonts on macOS include Bank Gothic, Bodoni, Century Gothic, Century Schoolbook, Garamond, several cuts of Lucida and Monotype Twentieth Century.

See also
 List of typefaces
 Unicode typefaces
 List of typefaces included with Microsoft Windows
 Fonts on the Mac

Notes

References

 Apple's font list for 10.3 (names only, no images)
 Apple's font list for 10.4 (names only, no images)
 Apple's font list for 10.5 (names only, no images)
 Apple's font list for 10.6 (names only, no images)
 Apple's font list for 10.7 (names only, no images)
 Apple's font list for 10.8 (names only, no images)
 Apple's font list for 10.9 (names only, no images)
 Apple's font list for 10.12 (names only, no images)
 Apple's font list for 10.13 (names only, no images)
 Apple's font list for 10.14 (names only, no images)
Apple's font list for 11 (names only, no images)

 Advanced Typography with Mac OS X Tiger (Appendix B contains representations of Latin fonts included with Mac OS 10.4 Tiger)
 Microsoft's list of Mac OS X installed fonts
 Alan Wood's list of common Mac OS X fonts
 Code Style's survey of Mac OS fonts (includes OS 8/9 users)
 Szántó Tibor: A betű (The type) (Hungarian; Akadémiai Kiadó, Budapest, 1982), Chapter XVI.

External links
 Revised (cross-platform) font stack (for the web)

 
typefaces included with macOS
OS X
MacOS